Pandėlys is a city in northern Lithuania. Apaščia River originates near the city and flows through it.

History
The origins of the name are associated with trade. One explanation goes that the name was derived from a word meaning "warehouse." Merchants from Vilnius and Riga would meet and exchange the goods somewhere in the area. Lithuanians called their storage places podėlis and Latvians – pondėlis. The other explanation claims that the name comes from panedėlis – Monday, the day of the week when the market was open.

The town is first mentioned in 1591. The manor belonged to the Rajecki family, who sold it to the Kościałkowskis in 1767. The new owners, Stumbrai, demolished the manor. Only a park is left, planted according to Italian traditions. Ignacy Kościałkowski built a brick church in 1801. Antanas Strazdas, a famous poet, worked for short period in the church. The city had an important Jewish community before their murder in 1941 Today, an important Jewish cemetery is still visible.

References

 

Cities in Lithuania
Cities in Panevėžys County
Novoalexandrovsky Uyezd
Holocaust locations in Lithuania